The Wives He Forgot is a 2006 film written and produced by J.J. Jamieson, directed by Mario Azzopardi and starring Molly Ringwald as Charlotte Saint John, a small town attorney, who comes to the aid of Gabriel (Mark Humphrey), a handsome stranger who's suffering from amnesia. Charlotte can't help but fall in love with this seemingly perfect man.  Their romance soon hits a snag when two women come into Charlotte's office claiming that they are married to Gabriel, whose real name is Jay. When Jay is charged with bigamy, Charlotte decides to defend him in court.

Cast
Molly Ringwald as Charlotte Saint John 
Mark Humphrey as Gabriel/Jay Miller 
Shannon Sturges as Gillian Mathers 
Maxim Roy as Alicia Miller 
Ellen Dubin as Gwen  
Lara Azzopardi as Mina Truman

External links

The Wives He Forgot - Peacock Films Page

2006 television films
2006 films
2006 drama films
Canadian television films
English-language Canadian films
Films about amnesia
Films directed by Mario Philip Azzopardi
2000s Canadian films